Wishmastour 2000 was a compilation by Finnish symphonic metal band Nightwish. Only one track (Wishmaster) appeared on an official album. The others songs were either bonus tracks from foreign versions of Angels Fall First and Oceanborn or unreleased versions of songs from all three of the albums.

Track listing
 "Wishmaster"
 "Sleepwalker (heavy version)"
 "Passion and the Opera (edit)"
 "Nightquest"
 "A Return to the Sea"
 "Once Upon a Troubadour"

Credits
Tarja Turunen – Lead vocals
Tuomas Holopainen – Keyboards, male vocals (on track 6)
Emppu Vuorinen – Lead guitars
Jukka Nevalainen – Drums
Sami Vänskä – Bass guitar

References

External links
Nightwish's Official Website

Nightwish albums
2000 compilation albums